The Minnesota Freeze is a United States Australian Football League (USAFL) club, based in Minnesota, United States. It was founded in 2005.

The club has both men's and women's teams. It has won the USAFL National Championships Division 2 men's competition in 2007, 2012 and 2018.

The club hosted a major regional USAFL tournament, the Central Regional Championship in 2022.

References

External links
 

Australian rules football clubs in the United States
Sports in Minneapolis
Australian rules football clubs established in 2005
2005 establishments in Minnesota